"No friends but the mountains" is a Kurdish proverb which is expressed to signify their feeling of betrayal, abandonment and loneliness due to their history as a semi-stateless ethnic minority in the Middle East without faithful allies.

See also
 No Friend But the Mountains, memoir by Kurdish writer Behrouz Boochani

References

Further reading
Literature
 
Documentary
 

Kurdish-language culture
Proverbs